Xiulang Bridge station is a station on the Taipei Metro's Circular line. The station was opened on 31 January 2020. It is located in Zhonghe District, New Taipei, Taiwan, near the banks of the Xindian River. The station name is derived of the bridge of the same name near the station.

Station layout

Exits
Exit 1: Chenggong Rd. (Xiulang Bridge, Xiushan Police Station)
Exit 2: Section 3 of Xiulang Rd, Jingping Rd. 
Overpass exit: Over Jingping Rd to the sidewalk next to the reserve headquarters

Around the station
 Xiulang Bridge (200m east of Exit 1)
 Xiushan Park (600m north of Exit 2)
 Xiulang Qingxi Riverside Park (1km southeast of Exit 1)
 De He Traditional Market (1.2km north of Exit 1)

References

2020 establishments in Taiwan
Circular line stations (Taipei Metro)
Zhonghe District
Railway stations opened in 2020